Masayuki Dobashi (土橋 正幸, 5 December 1935 – 24 August 2013) was a baseball player and manager in Japan. As a pitcher he won over 162 games. He played in the Pacific League for the Toei Flyers.  He died from ALS.

References

1935 births
2013 deaths
Baseball people from Tokyo
Japanese baseball players
Nippon Professional Baseball pitchers
Toei Flyers players
Managers of baseball teams in Japan
Hokkaido Nippon-Ham Fighters managers
Tokyo Yakult Swallows managers
Neurological disease deaths in Japan
Deaths from motor neuron disease